Kim Ba-woo (born 12 January 1984) is a South Korean former football player who played as a midfielder.

He was arrested on the charge connected with the match fixing allegations on 29 May 2011. On 17 June 2011, Kim's football career was rescinded by the K League with other accomplices.

Club career statistics

References

External links

1984 births
Living people
South Korean footballers
FC Seoul players
Daejeon Hana Citizen FC players
Pohang Steelers players
K League 1 players
Association football midfielders
Sportspeople banned for life